Sumon Khan (born 13 January 2000) is a Bangladeshi cricketer. He made his first-class debut for Dhaka Division in the 2018–19 National Cricket League on 29 October 2018. He made his Twenty20 debut for Bangladesh Krira Shikkha Protishtan in the 2018–19 Dhaka Premier Division Twenty20 Cricket League on 25 February 2019. He made his List A debut for Bangladesh Krira Shikkha Protishtan in the 2018–19 Dhaka Premier Division Cricket League on 8 March 2019.

In November 2019, he was named in Bangladesh's squad for the 2019 ACC Emerging Teams Asia Cup in Bangladesh. He was the leading wicket-taker in the tournament, with fourteen dismissals in five matches. Later the same month, he was selected to play for the Cumilla Warriors in the 2019–20 Bangladesh Premier League, and he was named in Bangladesh's squad for the men's cricket tournament at the 2019 South Asian Games. The Bangladesh team won the gold medal, after they beat Sri Lanka by seven wickets in the final.

In February 2021, he was selected in the Bangladesh Emerging squad for their home series against the Ireland Wolves.

References

External links
 

2000 births
Living people
Bangladeshi cricketers
Dhaka Division cricketers
Bangladesh Krira Shikkha Protishtan cricketers
People from Manikganj District
South Asian Games gold medalists for Bangladesh
South Asian Games medalists in cricket